Ferran Barenblit (born 1968, Buenos Aires) is an Argentine museum director. He studied Art History at the Universitat de Barcelona (1991) and Museology at New York University (1995).

Ferran Barenblit was director of the Centre d'Art Santa Mònica in Barcelona from 2003 to 2008, when he was appointed to direct  the CA2M in Madrid. Between 2015 and 2021 he was the director of the MACBA Barcelona Museum of Contemporary Art.

References

Bibliography 
 Barenblit, Ferran. Anatomies de l'ànima.  Barcelona: Fundació Miró, 1997 [Consulta: 12 abril 2013].
 Barenblit, Ferran. Cercles Invisibles.  Barcelona: Fundació Miró, 1998.
 Barenblit, Ferran. Ironia.  Barcelona: Fundació Miró, 2001. .

External links 
 «Ferran Barenblit, director del nuevo Centro de Arte Dos de Mayo de la Comunidad de Madrid» .   Revista de Arte, 11/4/2013.
 «CA2M: Programación de exposiciones».
 «Ferran Barenblit».   CCCB, 2008.
 «Barenblit dimite» 

Living people
Argentine expatriates in Spain
Argentine Jews
Directors of museums in Spain
People from Buenos Aires
1968 births
New York University alumni
University of Barcelona alumni
Jews
Curators